Ville Puumalainen (20 June 1900, in Rautalampi – 24 October 1962) was a Finnish bricklayer and politician. He was imprisoned for political reasons from 1931 to 1932. Puumalainen was a Member of the Parliament of Finland from 1945 to 1954, representing the Finnish People's Democratic League (SKDL). He belonged to the Communist Party of Finland (SKP) as well.

References

1900 births
1962 deaths
People from Rautalampi
People from Kuopio Province (Grand Duchy of Finland)
Communist Party of Finland politicians
Finnish People's Democratic League politicians
Members of the Parliament of Finland (1945–48)
Members of the Parliament of Finland (1948–51)
Members of the Parliament of Finland (1951–54)
Prisoners and detainees of Finland